Les trois dernières sonates de Franz Schubert is a French 1989 documentary film directed by Chantal Akerman, focusing on Franz Schubert’s last three piano sonatas. In the movie pianist Alfred Brendel plays and talks on sonatas.

References

Films directed by Chantal Akerman
French documentary films
Franz Schubert
1980s French films